Kenneth Stanley Read (28 September 1911 – 1 June 1999) was an Australian rules footballer who played with Fitzroy in the Victorian Football League (VFL).

Read later served in the Australian Army during World War II.

Notes

External links 

1911 births
1999 deaths
Australian rules footballers from Victoria (Australia)
Fitzroy Football Club players